Thomas Shore may refer to:

Thomas Shore (writer) (1793–1863), British writers
Thomas Shore (MP) for Derby (UK Parliament constituency)
Thomas William Shore (1840–1905), English geologist and antiquarian

See also
Thomas Shaw (disambiguation)